A Black Lady Sketch Show is an American television sketch comedy series created by Robin Thede for HBO. The show consists of comedy sketches performed by a main cast of Black women, currently consisting of producer and creator Thede, Gabrielle Dennis, and Skye Townsend. Alumni cast members include Quinta Brunson, Laci Mosley, and Ashley Nicole Black. The show has featured guest stars such as Issa Rae, Vanessa Williams, Angela Bassett, Laverne Cox, Nicole Byer, Amber Riley, Miguel, Omarion, Raven-Symoné, Kelly Rowland, Tia Mowry, Tahj Mowry, Gabrielle Union, Kyla Pratt, Wanda Sykes, and Patti LaBelle.

A Black Lady Sketch Show premiered with a season of six episodes on August 2, 2019, to "universal acclaim" according to review aggregator Metacritic. The first season received a 2020 TCA Award for Outstanding Achievement in Sketch/Variety Shows and season two won three Black Reel Awards. Seasons one and two hold a 100% rating on Rotten Tomatoes.

The second season premiered April 23, 2021 after being delayed due to the COVID-19 pandemic. In May 2021, the series was renewed for a third season, which debuted on April 8, 2022. In June 2022, the series was renewed for a fourth season.

Cast

Main cast

Recurring guest stars
Guest stars that have appeared in multiple episodes.

Essence Atkins
Bob the Drag Queen
Yvette Nicole Brown
Nicole Byer
David Alan Grier
Broderick Hunter
Phil LaMarr
Yvonne Orji
Natasha Rothwell
Issa Rae
Amber Riley
Holly Walker
Tyler James Williams

Episodes

Season 1 (2019)

Season 2 (2021)

Season 3 (2022)

Production

Development 

In the summer of 2018, Robin Thede invited her close friends and fellow comedians Quinta Brunson, Ashley Nicole Black, and Gabrielle Dennis to help her develop a comedy series. Thede then pitched the series to HBO as a way to address the dearth of Black women's representation in the American comedic landscape. Thede was encouraged by HBO executives to push boundaries and take risks with the show.

The show was originally titled The Black Lady Sketch Show but the name was changed to communicate to audiences that the series is a single representation of Black women in comedy. The show is thought to be the first sketch comedy series written, produced by, and starring Black women.

On January 28, 2019, it was announced that HBO had ordered a half-hour sketch show, A Black Lady Sketch Show, written and created by Robin Thede. Issa Rae is the co-executive producer with Thede through Issa Rae Productions, known as Hoorae as of 2021. The season one director is Dime Davis.  Season two was directed by Lacey Duke and Brittany Scott Smith. Bridget Murphy Stokes is the third season's director.

On August 27, 2019, HBO announced that A Black Lady Sketch Show had been renewed for a second season. Filming of the second season was put on hold due to the COVID-19 pandemic, but on March 23, 2021 it was announced that the six-episode season would premiere on April 23, 2021.

On May 24, 2021, HBO renewed the series for a third season.

On June 2, 2022, HBO renewed the series for a fourth season.

Casting 
On May 24, 2019, it was announced that the show would star Thede along with comediennes Ashley Nicole Black, Gabrielle Dennis, and Quinta Brunson. Angela Bassett, Gina Torres, and Marsai Martin were announced as three guest stars.

On March 23, 2021, it was announced that Brunson would not appear in season 2 due to scheduling conflicts. Additional changes for season 2 included the casting of Laci Mosley and Skye Townsend as main cast members. Confirmed guest stars include Gabrielle Union, Jesse Williams, Miguel, Skai Jackson, Laz Alonso, Omarion, Kim Wayans, Ayesha Curry, Lance Gross, and Wunmi Mosaku.

On March 2, 2022, it was announced that Mosley would not appear in season 3 due to scheduling conflicts. Guest appearances include Ava DuVernay, Michaela Jaé Rodriguez, Raven-Symoné, Wanda Sykes, David Alan Grier, Kyla Pratt, Jemele Hill, and Holly Robinson Peete.

Writers 
Lauren Ashley Smith was the show's head writer for the first two seasons. Additional writers for season one are Brittani Nichols, Rae Sanni, Holly Walker, Amber Ruffin and Akilah Green. Cast member Ashley Nicole Black also wrote for the show. It is the first television series to have a writer's room entirely composed of Black women. For the second season, Ruffin, and Nichols left the writer's room, and Kindsey Young, Shenovia Large, and Kristin Layne Tucker joined as additional writers. The season three writer's room retained Large and brought on new writers.

Release 
The series premiered on August 2, 2019. The second season premiered on April 23, 2021 on HBO and HBO Max. Season three premiered on April 8, 2022.

Reception

Season one 
The first season of A Black Lady Sketch Show received critical acclaim. On review aggregator website Rotten Tomatoes, the first season of A Black Lady Sketch Show holds an approval rating of 100%, with an average rating of 8.88/10 based on 20 reviews. The website's consensus reads, "Singular, subversive, and simply hilarious, A Black Lady Sketch Show finds universal humor in specific spaces to craft quick-witted sketches that perfectly showcase Robin Thede and her talented cast." According to review aggregator Metacritic, which uses a weighted average, the first season received an assigned score of 89 out of 100 based on reviews from 7 critics, indicating "universal acclaim." In a review by Ali Barthwell for The A.V. Club, she wrote, "A Black Lady Sketch Show possesses a confidence in its first season that suggests the show is not interested in being chopped up into easily consumable chunks. A Black Lady Sketch Show seems more interested in creating a whimsical, loving world for its leads." Writing for Vulture, Jen Chaney stated: "A Black Lady Sketch Show isn’t just funny. Its sketches are consistently clever and surprising, often concluding with twist endings that add a whole other layer to the jokes that had us rolling a couple of minutes ago."

In 2020, the show became the first Black women-led sketch show to receive a Primetime Emmy Award nomination for Outstanding Variety Sketch Series.

Season two 
The second season also received positive reception. It holds a score of 100% on Rotten Tomatoes based on eight critics' reviews.  IndieWire journalist Kristen Lopez said that the season "once again delivers hilarity and absurdity in equal measure." Margaret Lyons of the New York Times wrote that the show "has such a fun ear for specifics and lyricism, and the new season grows seamlessly into itself; the show’s recurring characters are back, and Robin Thede, its star and creator, is as dynamic as ever." Danette Chavez of The A.V. Club noted the show "has an air of reinvention" and "retains the cohesion, rapid-fire energy, and mix of culturally specific and universal humor that made the first season uproarious and a joy to watch."

The second season received five Emmy nominations, including Outstanding Variety Sketch Series and Outstanding Writing for a Variety Sketch Series. Daysha Broadway, Stephanie Filo, and Jessica Hernández received the Primetime Emmy Award for Outstanding Picture Editing for Variety Programming, the first all-women of color ensemble to receive the award in Emmy history. Season two was named to "best" year-end lists published by Paste, The A.V. Club, The Root, and NPR.

Season three 
Kristen Baldwin of EW rated the season an A− and hailed it as "consistently, ridiculously funny." Similarly, The A.V. Club's Jenna Scherer described the show: "In its third season, A Black Lady Sketch Show continues to blaze a trail as a show both by and for its titular demographic, unafraid to make cultural references that will gleefully whizz over the heads of white viewers." Scherer also complimented the chemistry of the cast members: "they share such an easy rapport, riffing off each other seemingly effortlessly whether the moment is scripted or improvised."

Awards and nominations

References

External links

Official website

2010s American black television series
2019 American television series debuts
HBO original programming
Television series by Home Box Office
Television series by 3 Arts Entertainment
2010s American sketch comedy television series
2020s American black television series
2020s American sketch comedy television series
African-American television
English-language television shows
Hoorae Media
Primetime Emmy Award-winning television series